Mark Pless is a Republican member of the North Carolina House of Representatives who has represented the 118th district (including all of Haywood, Madison, and Yancey counties) since 2021.

Electoral history

Committee assignments

2021-2022 session
Appropriations 
Federal Relations and American Indian Affairs - Vice Chair
Homeland Security, Military and Veterans Affairs 
Subcommittee on Appropriations, Health and Human Services
Transportation 
Wildlife Resources

References

External links

Living people
Year of birth missing (living people)
People from Canton, North Carolina
Republican Party members of the North Carolina House of Representatives
21st-century American politicians